Charles Fang was an American actor and comedian who was active in Hollywood primarily during the silent era. He was active on Broadway from 1930 to 1935. He was known during his time as "the greatest Chinese actor in America."

Biography 
Fang was born in San Francisco to parents from Canton, China. He reportedly graduated from Yale University and served in the U.S. Navy before becoming a professional actor on the stage and screen. Reportedly discovered by Rex Ingram, Fang also served as a cultural advisor and interpreter on film sets.

Selected filmography 

 My Sin (1931)
 Sunken Silver (1925)
 Haldane of the Secret Service (1923)
 The Ragged Edge (1923)
 Backbone (1923)
 Jacqueline (1923)
 Married People (1922)
 Boomerang Bill (1922)
 Dream Street (1921)
 Pagan Love (1920)
 Checkers (1919)
 God's Outlaw (1919)
 Mandarin's Gold (1919)
 Cheerful Liars (1918)
 Fate and Fortune (1918)
 Feet and Defeat (1918)
 Parson Pepp (1918)
 The Chinese Musketeer (1918)
 The Ring and the Ringer (1918)
 The Forbidden City (1918)
 Nuts and Noodles (1918)
 Cyclone Higgins, D.D. (1918)
 The Jury of Fate (1917)
 The Slacker (1917)
 The Great Secret (1917)
 In the Diplomatic Service (1916)
 Broken Fetters (1916)

References 

American male film actors
American male silent film actors
20th-century American male actors
1882 births
Year of death missing
American male stage actors